Vojens Municipality, was a municipality (Danish, kommune) in the former South Jutland County on the Jutland peninsula in south Denmark. Its last mayor was Nis Mikkelsen, a member of the Venstre (Liberal Party) political party.

The site of its municipal council was the town of Vojens.

 Hammelev Parish
 Jegerup Parish
 Magstrup Parish
 Nustrup Parish
 Oksenvad Parish
 Skrydstrup Parish
 Sommersted Parish
 Vedsted Parish
 Vojens Parish

On 1 January 2007 Vojens municipality ceased to exist, as the result of Kommunalreformen ("The Municipality Reform" of 2007).  It merged with existing Gram and Haderslev municipalities, as well as Bjerning, Hjerndrup, Fjelstrup and Bevtoft parishes of Christiansfeld municipality to form the new Haderslev municipality.

References 
 Municipal statistics: NetBorger Kommunefakta, delivered from KMD aka Kommunedata (Municipal Data)
 Municipal mergers and neighbors: Eniro new municipalities map

External links 
 Haderslev municipality's official website 

Former municipalities of Denmark